Thricops diaphanus is a fly from the family Muscidae. It is found in the Palearctic .

References

External links
D'Assis Fonseca, E.C.M, 1968 Diptera Cyclorrhapha Calyptrata: Muscidae Handbooks for the Identification of British Insects pdf
Seguy, E. (1923) Diptères Anthomyides. Paris: Éditions Faune de France Faune n° 6 393 p., 813 fig.Bibliotheque Virtuelle Numerique  pdf

Muscidae
Diptera of Europe
Insects described in 1817